The 2017 Antrim Senior Football Championship is the 116th official edition of Antrim GAA's premier club Gaelic football tournament for senior clubs in County Antrim. The tournament consists of 13 teams with the winner representing Antrim in the Ulster Senior Club Football Championship. The championship has a straight knock-out format.

St Paul's, St James' and St Mary's returned to the senior championship in 2017.

Erin's Own GAC, Cargin were the defending champions after they defeated St Gall's in the 2016 final.

Promoted from 2016 IFC
 St Mary's Aghagallon  -  (IFC Champions & Div 2A FL Champions)
 St Paul's - (2nd in Div 2A FL)
 St James' - (Ongoing participation in Div 1 FL)

Relegated to 2017 IFC
 All Saints (12th in Division 1B FL)
 St Brigid's (11th in Division 1B FL)

Round 1
10 of the 13 senior clubs play in this round. The 5 winners and the 3 teams who received byes compete in the quarter-finals. The 5 losing teams exit the championship.

Quarter-finals
The 5 Round 1 winners and the 3 teams who received byes in Round 1 compete in this round. The losing teams exit the championship.

Semi-finals

Final

Championship Bracket

Ulster Senior Club Football Championship

References

Antrim Senior Football Championship
Antrim Senior Football Championship